NGC 74 is a lenticular galaxy located in the Andromeda constellation. It was discovered on 7 October 1855 by Irish astronomer William Parsons.

See also 
 
 List of NGC objects

References

External links 
 
 NGC 74 on spider.seds.org
 NGC 74 on WikiSky

NGC 0074
0074
NGC 0074
18851007
001219
Discoveries by William Parsons, 3rd Earl of Rosse